Broken World may refer to:
 "Broken World" (Millennium), an episode of the television series Millennium
 "Broken World" (song), a song by Millencolin
 Dungeon Siege II: Broken World, an expansion pack for the video game Dungeon Siege II